Norway was represented by Jahn Teigen, with the song "Do Re Mi", at the 1983 Eurovision Song Contest, which took place on 23 April in Munich. "Do Re Mi" was chosen as the Norwegian entry at the Melodi Grand Prix on 25 February. This was the third and final Eurovision appearance by Teigen. Although uncredited on this occasion, one of his backing singers was Anita Skorgan, making her fourth appearance in seven years.

Before Eurovision

Melodi Grand Prix 1983 
The Melodi Grand Prix 1983 was held at the studios of broadcaster NRK in Oslo, hosted by Ivar Dyrhaug. Ten songs took part in the final, with the winner chosen by voting from 12 regional juries.

At Eurovision 
On the night of the final Teigen performed second in the running order, following France and preceding the United Kingdom. At the close of voting "Do Re Mi" had picked up 53 points (the highest being 8s from Denmark and the Netherlands), placing Norway joint 9th (with Austria) of the 20 entries, the country's first top 10 finish since 1973. The Norwegian jury awarded its 12 points to Sweden.

Voting

References

External links 
Full national final on nrk.no

1983
Countries in the Eurovision Song Contest 1983
1983
Eurovision
Eurovision